Oscar Quiñones may refer to:
Oscar Quiñones (chess player) (born 1941), Peruvian chess player
Óscar Quiñones (artist) (1919–1987), Peruvian artist